The Nixie, Nixy, Nix, Näcken, Nicor, Nøkk, or Nøkken (Norwegian ; ; ; ; ; ; ; ;  or ) are humanoid, and often shapeshifting water spirits in Germanic mythology and folklore.

Under a variety of names, they are common to the stories of all Germanic peoples, although they are perhaps best known from Scandinavian folklore. The related English knucker was generally depicted as a worm or dragon, although more recent versions depict the spirits in other forms. Their sex, bynames, and various transformations vary geographically. The German  and his Scandinavian counterparts were male. The German  was a female river mermaid. Similar creatures are known from other parts of Europe, such as the Melusine in France, the Xana in Asturias (Spain), and the Slavic water spirits (e.g. the Rusalka) in Slavic countries.

Names and etymology

The Icelandic and Faroese  are horselike creatures. In Middle Low German, it was called  and in Middle Dutch  (compare also  or  plus ). The Old High German form  also meant "crocodile", while the Old English  could mean both a "water monster" like those encountered by Beowulf, and a "hippopotamus". The Norwegian  and Swedish  are related figures sometimes seen as by-names for the same creature.

England
These include Jenny Greenteeth, the Shellycoat, the river-hag Peg Powler, the -like Brag, and the Grindylow.

At Lyminster, near Arundel in the English county of West Sussex, there are today said to dwell "water-wyrms" called knuckers, in a pool called the Knucker-hole. The great Victorian authority Walter William Skeat had plausibly suggested the pool's name of knucker (a name attested from 1835, Horsfield) was likely derived from the Old English , a creature-name found in Beowulf. Yet the waters at the pool were badly muddied by a local antiquarian named Samuel Evershed, who from 1866 tried assiduously to connect the pool with dragons and thus with the tale of St. George and the Dragon. Any authentic water-sprite folklore the site may originally have had was thus trampled down by Evershed's enthusiastic inculcation of the local people in ideas about water-dragons.

The Nordic Countries

Näck, Nøkk

However, not all of these spirits were necessarily malevolent; many stories indicate at the very least that  were entirely harmless to their audience and attracted not only women and children, but men as well with their sweet songs. Stories also exist wherein the Fossegrim agreed to live with a human who had fallen in love with him, but many of these stories ended with the  returning to his home, usually a nearby waterfall or brook. (Compare the legend of Llyn y Fan Fach in Wales.) The  were said to grow despondent unless they had free, regular contact with a water source.

It is difficult to describe the appearance of the nix, as one of his central attributes was thought to be shapeshifting. Perhaps he did not have any true shape. He could show himself as a man playing the violin in brooks and waterfalls (though often imagined as fair and naked today, in folklore he was more frequently described as wearing more or less elegant clothing) but also could appear to be treasure or various floating objects, or as an animal—most commonly in the form of a "brook horse" (see below). Thus, it is likely that the figure of the brook horse preceded the personification of the nix as the "man in the rapids".  and derivatives were almost always portrayed as especially beautiful young men, whose clothing (or lack thereof) varied widely from story to story.

He was thought to be most active during Midsummer's Night, on Christmas Eve, and on Thursdays. However, these superstitions do not necessarily relate to all the versions listed here. Many, if not all of them, developed after the Christianizing of the northern countries, as was the case of similar stories of faeries and other entities in other areas.

When malicious  attempted to carry off people, they could be defeated by calling their name; this was believed to cause their death.

The  was also an omen for drowning accidents. He would scream at a particular spot in a lake or river, in a way reminiscent of the loon, and on that spot, a fatality would later take place. He was also said to cause drownings, but swimmers could protect themselves against such a fate by throwing a bit of steel into the water.

In the later Romantic folklore and folklore-inspired stories of the 19th century, the  sings about his loneliness and his longing for salvation, which he purportedly never shall receive, as he is not "a child of God". In the poem, arguably Stagnelius' most famous, the boy says that the  will never be a "child of God" which brings "tears to his face" as he "never plays again in the silvery brook".

On a similar theme, a 19th-century text called "Brother Fabian's Manuscript" by Sebastian Evans has this verse:

(The source has "bloometh" for "boometh", but this is clearly an error; a bittern is not a plant, but a bird, and it is known for its booming call. A "ghittern" is a guitar. The spelling "Nickar" vice "Neckar" is sometimes used.)

In Scandinavia, water lilies are called "nix roses" (/). A tale from the forest of Tiveden relates that a father promised his daughter to a  who offered him great hauls of fish in a time of need; she refused and stabbed herself to death, staining the water lilies red from that time on:

In horse form

In Faroese, the word  refers specifically to a supernatural horse, described in one Faroese text thus:

It has a close parallel in the Scottish kelpie, and the Welsh .

The  was often described as a majestic white horse that would appear near rivers, particularly during foggy weather. Anyone who climbed onto its back would not be able to get off again. The horse would then jump into the river, drowning the rider. The brook horse could also be harnessed and made to plough, either because it was trying to trick a person or because the person had tricked the horse into it. The following tale is a good illustration of the brook horse:

Germany
The German Nix and Nixe (and Nixie) are types of river merman and mermaid who may lure men to drown, like the Scandinavian type, akin to the Celtic Melusine and similar to the Greek Siren. The German epic Nibelungenlied mentions the Nix in connection with the Danube, as early as 1180 to 1210.

Nixes in folklore became water sprites who try to lure people into the water. The males can assume many different shapes, including that of a human, fish, and snake. The females bear the tail of a fish. When they are in human forms, they can be recognised by the wet hem of their clothes. The Nixes are portrayed as malicious in some stories but harmless and friendly in others.

By the 19th century Jacob Grimm mentions the Nixie to be among the "water-sprites" who love music, song and dancing, and says "Like the sirens, the Nixie by her song draws listening youth to herself, and then into the deep." According to Grimm, they can appear human but have the barest hint of animal features: the nix had "a slit ear", and the Nixie "a wet skirt". Grimm thinks these could symbolise they are "higher beings" who could shapeshift to animal form.

One famous Nixe of recent German folklore, deriving from 19th-century literature, was Lorelei; according to the legend, she sat on the rock at the Rhine which now bears her name, and lured fishermen and boatmen to the dangers of the reefs with the sound of her voice. In Switzerland there is a legend of a sea-maid or Nixe that lived in Lake Zug (the lake is in the Canton of Zug).

The Yellow Fairy Book by Andrew Lang includes a story called "The Nixie of the Mill-Pond" in which a malevolent spirit that lives in a mill pond strikes a deal with the miller that she will restore his wealth in exchange for his son. This story is taken from Grimms' Fairy Tales.

The legend of Heer Halewijn, a dangerous lord who lures women to their deaths with a magic song, may have originated with the Nix.

Alternate names (kennings) for the female German Nixe are Rhine maidens and Lorelei.

In a fictional depiction, the Rhine maidens are among the protagonists in the four-part Opera Der Ring des Nibelungen by the composer Richard Wagner, based loosely on the nix of the Nibelungenlied.

The Rhine maidens Wellgunde, Woglinde, and Floßhilde (Flosshilde) belong to a group of characters living in a part of nature free from human influence. Erda and the Norns are also considered a part of this 'hidden' world.

They are first seen in the first work of the Nibelungen cycle, Das Rheingold, as guardians of the Rheingold, a treasure of gold hidden in the Rhein river. The dwarf Alberich, a Nibelung, is eager to win their favour, but they somewhat cruelly dismiss his flattery. They tell him that only one who is unable to love can win the Rheingold. Thus, Alberich curses love and steals the Rheingold. From the stolen gold he forges a ring of power. Further on in the cycle, the Rhine maidens are seen trying to regain the ring and transform it back into the harmless Rheingold. But no one will return the ring to them; not even the supreme god Wotan, who uses the ring to pay the giants Fasolt and Fafner for building Valhalla, nor the hero Siegfried, when the maidens appear to him in the third act of Götterdämmerung. Eventually Brünnhilde returns it to them at the end of the cycle, when the fires of her funeral pyre cleanse the ring of its curse.

Descendants of German immigrants to Pennsylvania sometimes refer to a mischievous child as being "nixie".

In popular culture 

In the video game Tom Clancy's Rainbow Six Siege, the Danish operator Nøkk is named for the mythical creature.

In The Nixie's Song, the first book in the children's series Beyond the Spiderwick Chronicles, the main characters rescue a Nixie named Taloa after her pond is destroyed by fire-breathing giants. Nixies are depicted as aquatic female humanoids related to mermaids, but with frog-like legs instead of tails.

In the 2017 game Unforgiving: A Northern Hymn the Näcken is portrayed as villainous in the story, tempting the protagonist into handing him Freyjas' Harp as part of an endless limbo.

In the 2019 film Frozen II, Queen Elsa of Arendelle encounters and tames the Nøkk (in the form of a horse), the Water spirit who guards the sea to the mythical river Ahtohallan.

Nekkers are a common swamp and water area enemy in the award winning "The Witcher" Video games.

The 2021 video game Valheim features Neck as a common type of enemy encountered near water. In contrast to their humanoid appearances in folklore, the Neck in Valheim are depicted as small, aggressive lizards.

In the 2021 novel Lone Wolf by Sam Hall, the main character, Paige, is a nix. The mythological version of the nix exists in the world as lore, but a nix is also a special female wolf shifter. She has greater powers and calls to all eligible bachelors, pitting them against each other and then taking the greatest of the fighters as her mates.

In the 2021 game Northern Journey, Nøkken is used as the cover art for the game, and can be found in-game as part of the story. The game also has a related soundtrack called "Nokkpond".

A 2021 Urban Fantasy series of novels, The Legend of Nyx by Theophilus Monroe, highlights a "nyx" who attempted to seduce a vampire by song and lost her abilities, freezing her in a human form and seeking vengeance on the vampire who bit her.

In the 2013 novel "Dead in the Water", the character Quinby Stromhest is a nøkken.

In the mobile game Year Walk, one of the Watchers is a Brook Horse, put in charge of newly found Mylings.

In the subsequent Year Walk: Bedtime Stories for Awful Children, the second chapter is devoted to the Brook Horse.

See also 
 Water horse
 Nuckelavee
 Hulder
 Kelpie
 Naiad
 Selkie
 Undine
 Taniwha

Notes

References 
 Riordan, Rick (2017). Magnus Chase and the gods of Asgard: The Ship of the Dead
 Grimm, Jacob (1835). Deutsche Mythologie (German Mythology); From English released version Grimm's Teutonic Mythology (1888); Available online by Northvegr 2004–2007: Chapter 17, page 11; Chapter 33, page 2. File retrieved 4 June 2007.
 Hellström, AnneMarie (1985). Jag vill så gärna berätta.... .
 Karlsson, S. (1970). I Tiveden, Reflex, Mariestad.

External links

 The Watersprite, an amateur translation (no rhyme, no meter) of Stagnelius's poem.
 Manxnotebook
 Sacred-Texts.com
 Scandinavian Folklore

Creatures in Norse mythology
Danish folklore
Danish legendary creatures
English folklore
English legendary creatures
Faroese folklore
German legendary creatures
Medieval literature
Mermaids
Scandinavian folklore
Scandinavian legendary creatures
Swedish folklore
Shapeshifting
Water spirits
Horses in mythology
Germanic legendary creatures